Mingullatharndo is a small Aboriginal community, located in the Pilbara region of Western Australia, within the City of Karratha.

Background 
Mingullatharndo Aboriginal Community (also known as 5 Mile) is located approximately 8 km south east of the Roebourne townsite. Access to the community is via a sealed road which connects with North West Coastal Highway.

The Mingullatharndo Association Inc. was established in 1986 by members of the Apostolic Church in Roebourne. The purpose of the community is to provide support for displaced persons and others with social or abuse problems.

Native title 
The community is located within the fully determined Ngarluma / Yindjibarndi (WAD6017/96) native title claim area.

Governance 
The community is managed through its incorporated body, Mingullatharndo Association Inc.

Town planning 
Mingullatharndo Layout Plan No.2 was prepared in accordance with State Planning Policy 3.2 Aboriginal Settlements and was endorsed by the community in 2007 and the Western Australian Planning Commission in 2008.

References

External links
 Native Title Claimant application summary

Towns in Western Australia
Aboriginal communities in Pilbara